The Palatine Chapel is the royal chapel of the Norman Palace in Palermo, Sicily. This building is a mixture of Byzantine, Norman and Fatimid architectural styles, showing the tricultural state of Sicily during the 12th century after Roger I and Robert Guiscard conquered the island.

Also referred to as a Palace church or Palace chapel, it was commissioned by Roger II of Sicily in 1132 to be built upon an older chapel (now the crypt) constructed around 1080. It took eight years to build, receiving a royal charter the same year, with the mosaics being only partially finished by 1143. The sanctuary, dedicated to Saint Peter, is reminiscent of a domed basilica. It has three apses, as is usual in Byzantine architecture, with six pointed arches (three on each side of the central nave) resting on recycled classical columns. The muqarnas ceiling of the nave and the chapel's rectilinear form show the Fatimid influence in the building's construction

Mosaics

The mosaics of the Palatine Chapel are of unparalleled elegance as concerns elongated proportions and streaming draperies of figures. They are also noted for subtle modulations of colour and luminance. The oldest are probably those covering the ceiling, the drum, and the dome. The shimmering mosaics of the transept, presumably dating from the 1140s and attributed to Byzantine artists, with an illustrated scene, along the north wall, of St. John in the desert and a landscape of Agnus Dei. Below this are five saints, the Greek fathers of the church, St. Gregory of Nissa, St. Gregory the Theologian, St. Basil, St. John Chrysostom and St. Nicholas. The three central figures, St. Gregory, St. Basil, and St. John Chrysostom, are the Three Great Orthodox Church Fathers referred to as the Three Hierarchs, which originated fifty years earlier. Every composition is set within an ornamental frame, not dissimilar to that used in contemporaneous mosaic icons. 

The rest of the mosaics, dated to the 1160s or the 1170s, are executed in a cruder manner and feature Latin (rather than Greek) inscriptions. Probably a work of local craftsmen, these pieces are more narrative and illustrative than transcendental. A few mosaics have a secular character and represent oriental flora and fauna. This may be the only substantial passage of secular Byzantine mosaic extant today.

Muqarnas ceiling 
The structure is influenced by Fatimid art style, with the nave ceiling taking from Fatimid art through the use of muqarnas. The nave is similar to Islamic reception halls with the presence of the muqarnas vaulted ceiling and arches along the colonnade. There is also an indication of Kufic script in the Cappella Palatina, this however, is highly debated by scholars because the inscriptions were removed later. It is thought to be likely that these Kufic inscriptions were intended for the structure due to the presence of Kufic inscriptions in other structures built for or by King Roger II. The Cappella Palatina is also influenced by the Islamic style of having rectilinear patterns, uncommon to European art at the time.

The hundreds of facets of the Muqarnas ceiling were painted, notably with many purely ornamental vegetal and zoomorphic designs but also with scenes of daily life and many subjects that have not yet been explained. Stylistically influenced by Egyptian Fatimid Art, these paintings are innovative in their more spatially aware representation of personages and of animals.

Most muqarnas are made out of stucco or stone but the muqarnas in the Cappella Palatina are molded and carved with wood. There are arch shaped panels as the main construction and hidden panels that help center wood cuts for the small vaults in the muqarnas. The muqarnas has 5 horizontal tiers that allow a smooth transition from the ceiling to the walls of the nave. The ceiling is supported by horizontal cavetto wood moldings that touch the upper part of the windows. There are 8 point stars on the ceiling of the nave that are created with an overlay of two squares at a 45-degree angle. The muqarnas ceiling was built most likely after the mosaics of the nave ordered by William I.

Chapel

The chapel combines harmoniously a variety of styles: the Norman architecture and door decor, the  Arabic arches and ceiling designs and script adorning the roof, the Byzantine dome and mosaics. For instance, clusters of four eight-pointed stars, typical for Muslim design, are arranged on the ceiling so as to form a Christian cross.

The Cappella Palatina is built along an east–west axis. On the west side resides the throne platform and on the east side is the sanctuary with the nave connecting these two sides, with domes over each side.  Along the northern wall of the sanctuary is the royal balcony and the northern chapel, where the King would watch and listen to the liturgy on special feast days. Along the nave runs two rows of colonnades, with windows in between each colonnade. The chapel was decorated with gold, pearls, porphyry, silk and marble.

The chapel has been considered a union of a Byzantine church sanctuary and a Western basilica nave. The sanctuary, is of an "Eastern" artistic nature, while the nave reflects "Western" influences.

Nave
The nave, constructed under Roger II, did not contain any Christian images. These were added later by Roger II's successors, William I and William II. The nave's ceiling consists of Arab, Greek and Latin inscriptions.

The frame for the royal throne sets against the west wall of the nave. There are six steps leading up to where the throne would be, along with two heraldic lions in two roundels upon the spandrels over the throne frame gable.

Part of the nave of the Cappella Palatina

The nave had different forms of decoration from the north and south to the east and west. Intricate lacing from the ceiling mold outline the arches of the nave in the north and South. These outlines are accompanied by oval medallions and cartouches.  In the East and West, the decoration is similar to the muqarnas ceiling but is missing some molding for the borders of the ceiling.

Sanctuary

As an expression of Norman culture, St. Dionysius and St. Martin are represented in the sanctuary. Mosaics are of Byzantine culture in their composition and subjects. The apex of the dome consists of the Pantokrator, with rows of angels, prophets, evangelists and saints. The Byzantine motif ends abruptly with scenes from Christ's life along the south wall of the southern transept arm, while the north wall consists of warrior saints.

Analysis
Slobodan Ćurčić considers the Palatine Cappella a reflection of Middle Byzantine art. Illustrating architectural and artistic genius to juxtapose Sicily's "melting pot" culture.

According to European historians, Roger II made the decision to make the throne room and chapel equal in the main part of the Cappella Palatina in order to send a message to the papacy and other rulers of Europe that he was going to stay in Sicily and there was nothing they could do about it.

Notes

References

 Agnello, Fabrizio. “The Painted Ceiling Of The Nave Of The Cappella Palatina In Palermo: An Essay On Its Geometric And Constructive Features.” Muqarnas Online, vol. 27, no. 1, 2011, pp. 407–447., doi:10.1163/22118993-90000170.
 Booms, Dirk. “The Normans: The Conquest.” Sicily: Culture and Conquest: by Dirk Booms and Peter Higgs, New York, 2016, pp. 178–220.
 Britt, Karen C. “Roger II of Sicily: Rex, Basileus, and Khalif? Identity, Politics and Propaganda in the Cappella Palatina.” Mediterranean Studies, vol. 16, 2007, pp. 21 – 45. JSTOR, https://www.jstor.org/stable/41167003
 
 Grube, Ernst J., and Jeremy Johns. The Painted Ceilings of the Cappella Palatina. Bruschettini Foundation for Islamic and Asian Art, 2005.
 Johns, Jeremy. “Diversity by Design: The art of Norman Sicily is celebrated for its juxtaposition of Islamic, Byzantine, and Romanesque elements – a remarkable feat of cultural engineering that was a deliberate display of power by the island’s ruler.” Apollo Magazine Ltd., 2016, pp. 80 – 85.
 Kitzinger, Ernst. “The Mosaics of the Cappella Palatina in Palermo: An Essay on the Choice and Arrangement of Subjects.” The Art Bulletin, vol. 31, no. 4, 1949, pp. 269–292. JSTOR, www.jstor.org/stable/3047256.

See also

Arab-Norman Palermo and the Cathedral Churches of Cefalù and Monreale
 History of medieval Arabic and Western European domes

Palazzo dei Normanni
Arab-Norman Palermo and the Cathedral Churches of Cefalù and Monreale
Arab-Norman architecture in Palermo
Churches completed in 1140
12th-century churches in Italy
Roman Catholic chapels in Italy
Roman Catholic churches in Palermo
Norman architecture in Italy
Churches with Norman architecture
Byzantine art
World Heritage Sites in Italy
Roger II of Sicily